Hecatostemon completus is a species of shrub or tree native to northeastern South America and is the only member of the genus Hecatostemon.

Taxonomy
Formerly classified in the Flacourtiaceae, phylogenetic analyses based on DNA data indicate that this species, along with its close relatives in Casearia, Samyda, Laetia, and Zuelania, are better placed in a broadly circumscribed Salicaceae.

Description
Hecatostemon differs from its close relatives in having numerous stamens in three series and one ring of staminodes, or "disk," inside the stamens.

Distribution and habitat
The species is found in tropical deciduous forests, matorrales, savannahs, and even saline flats in northern Brazil, Colombia, Guyana, Peru, and Venezuela.

References

Salicaceae
Monotypic Malpighiales genera
Flora of South America
Salicaceae genera